Thomas Broun (15 July 1838 – 24 August 1919) was a New Zealand soldier, farmer, teacher and entomologist. He was born in Edinburgh, Midlothian, Scotland on 15 July 1838.

Bibliography
Descriptions of new genera and species of coleoptera, Bulletin of the Royal Society of New Zealand 1 (1917).

List of honours
  Chevalier de la Légion d'honneur (France), 1916.

References

External links
Digitized works by Thomas Broun at Biodiversity Heritage Library

1838 births
1919 deaths
New Zealand farmers
New Zealand educators
Scottish emigrants to New Zealand
New Zealand entomologists
New Zealand recipients of the Légion d'honneur
Military leaders of the New Zealand Wars
New Zealand military personnel
Scientists from Edinburgh